Aljaž is a Slovenian masculine given name and an occasional surname. Notable people with the name include:

Given name 
Aljaž Bedene (born 1989), British tennis player
Aljaž Cotman (born 1994), Slovenian football goalkeeper
Aljaž Hočevar (born 1991), Slovenian cyclist
Aljaž Ivačič (born 1993), Slovenian football player
Aljaž Krefl (born 1994), Slovenian football defender
Aljaž Osterc (born 1999), Slovenian ski jumper
Aljaž Pegan (born 1974), Slovenian gymnast
Aljaž Sedej (born 1988), Slovenian judoka
Aljaž Škorjanec (born 1990), Slovenian dancer and choreographer 
Aljaž Struna (born 1990), Slovenian football defender

Surname 
Jakob Aljaž (1845–1927), Slovene Roman Catholic priest, composer and mountaineer 

Slovene-language surnames
Slovene masculine given names